The 4th Infantry Division is a division of the United States Army based at Fort Carson, Colorado.  It is composed of a division headquarters battalion, three brigade combat teams (two Stryker and one armor), a combat aviation brigade, a division sustainment brigade, and a division artillery.

The 4th Infantry Division's official nickname, "Ivy", is a play on words of the Roman numeral IV or 4.  Ivy leaves symbolize tenacity and fidelity which is the basis of the division's motto: "Steadfast and Loyal".  The second nickname, "Iron Horse", has been adopted to underscore the speed and power of the division and its soldiers.

World War I
The 4th Division was organized at Camp Greene, North Carolina on 10 December 1917 under the command of Maj. Gen. George H. Cameron. It was here they adopted their distinctive insignia, the four ivy leaves. The ivy leaf came from the Roman numerals for four (IV) and signified their motto "Steadfast and Loyal". The division was organized as part of the United States buildup following the Declaration of War on 6 April 1917 and the entry of the United States into the war on the side of the British and French.

Organization

 Headquarters, 4th Division
 7th Infantry Brigade
 39th Infantry Regiment
 47th Infantry Regiment
 8th Infantry Brigade
 58th Infantry Regiment
 59th Infantry Regiment
 4th Field Artillery Brigade
 13th Field Artillery Regiment (155 mm)
 16th Field Artillery Regiment (75 mm)
 77th Field Artillery Regiment (75 mm)
 4th Trench Mortar Battery
 4th Engineer Regiment
 8th Field Signal Battalion
 Headquarters Troop, 4th Division
 4th Train Headquarters and Military Police
 4th Ammunition Train
 4th Supply Train
 4th Engineer Train
 4th Sanitary Train
 19th, 21st, 28th, and 33rd Ambulance Companies and Field Hospitals

St. Mihiel Offensive
For the Battle of Saint-Mihiel, the division moved into an area south of Verdun as part of the First United States Army. General John Pershing, commander of the American Expeditionary Force (AEF) on the Western Front, had gotten the French and British to agree that the AEF would fight under its own organizational elements. One of the first missions assigned to the AEF was the reduction of the Saint-Mihiel salient. The 4th Division, assigned to V Corps, was on the western face of the salient. The plan was for V Corps to push generally southeast and to meet IV Corps who was pushing northwest, thereby trapping the Germans in the St. Mihiel area.

The 59th Infantry Regiment moved into an area previously occupied by the French, deploying along a nine kilometer front. On 12 September, the first patrols were sent forward by the 59th. The 4th Division attack began on 14 September with the 8th Brigade capturing the town of Manheulles. All along the front, the American forces pressed forward and closed the St. Mihiel salient.

Occupation duty

Under the terms of the Armistice, Germany was to evacuate all territory west of the Rhine. American troops were to relocate to the center section of this previously German-occupied area all the way to the Koblenz bridgehead on the Rhine. The 4th marched into Germany, covering 330 miles in 15 days where it was widely dispersed over an area with Bad Bertrich as Division headquarters. The division established training for the men as well as sports and educational activities. In April 1919 the division moved to a new occupation area further north on the Rhine.

The division went north to Ahrweiler, Germany, in the Rheinland-Pfalz area. In July the division returned to France and the last detachment sailed for the United States on 31 July 1919.

Interwar period

The 4th Division was stationed at Camp Dodge, Iowa, until January 1920. After that date, it was stationed at Camp Lewis, Washington.  On 21 September 1921, the 4th Division was inactivated due to funding cuts, but was represented in the Regular Army by its even-numbered infantry brigade (the 8th) and select supporting elements. The division headquarters, as well as most of the other inactive units of the division, were authorized to be staffed by Organized Reserve personnel and designated as Regular Army Inactive units. The division headquarters was occasionally reassembled, such as for the September 1936 U.S. Third Army command post exercise at Camp Bullis, Texas, or for the August 1938 maneuvers in the De Soto National Forest in Mississippi.

World War II

The 4th Division was reactivated on 1 June 1940 at Fort Benning, Georgia, under the command of Major General Walter Prosser. Commencing in August the formation was reorganized as a motorized division and assigned (along with the 2nd Armored Division) to I Armored Corps, being officially given its motorized title in parenthesized style and then formally as the 4th Motorized Division effective 11 July 1941. The division participated in Louisiana maneuvers held during August 1941 and then in the Carolina Maneuvers of October 1941, after which it returned to Fort Benning. The division transferred to Camp Gordon, Georgia, in December 1941, the month America entered World War II, and rehearsed training at the Carolina Maneuvers during the summer of 1942.

The division, now under the command of Major General Raymond O. Barton, then moved on 12 April 1943 to Fort Dix, New Jersey, where it was again reconfigured and redesignated the 4th Infantry Division on 4 August of that year. The division participated in battlefield maneuvers in Florida starting in September and after this fall training exercise arrived at Camp Jackson, South Carolina, on 1 December 1943. At this station the division was alerted for overseas movement and staged at Camp Kilmer, New Jersey, beginning 4 January 1944 prior to departing the New York Port of Embarkation on 18 January 1944. The 4th Infantry Division sailed to England where it arrived on 26 January 1944.

France
The 4th Infantry Division assaulted the northern coast of German-held France during the Normandy landings, landing at Utah Beach, 6 June 1944. The 8th Infantry Regiment of the 4th Infantry Division claimed being the first surface-borne Allied unit (as opposed to the parachutist formations that were air-dropped earlier) to hit the beaches at Normandy on D-Day, 6 June 1944. Relieving the isolated 82nd Airborne Division at Sainte-Mère-Église, the 4th cleared the Cotentin peninsula and took part in the capture of Cherbourg on 25 June. After taking part in the fighting near Periers, 6–12 July, the division broke through the left flank of the German 7th Army, helping to stem the German drive toward Avranches. 

By the end of August the division had moved to Paris, and gave French forces the first place in the liberation of their capital. During the liberation of Paris, Ernest Hemingway took on a self-appointed role as a civilian scout in the city of Paris for his friends in the 4 ID. He was with the 22nd Infantry Regiment when it advanced from Paris, northeast through Belgium, and into Germany. J. D. Salinger, who met Hemingway during the liberation of Paris, was with the 12th Infantry Regiment.

Belgium, Luxembourg, and Germany
The 4th then moved into Belgium through Houffalize to attack the Siegfried Line at Schnee Eifel on 14 September, and made several penetrations. Slow progress into Germany continued in October, and by 6 November the division entered the Battle of Hurtgen Forest, where it was engaged in heavy fighting until early December. It then shifted to Luxembourg, only to meet the German Army's winter Ardennes Offensive head-on (in the Battle of the Bulge) starting on 16 December 1944. Although its lines were dented, it managed to hold the Germans at Dickweiler and Osweiler, and, counterattacking in January across the Sauer, overran German positions in Fouhren and Vianden. 

Halted at the Prüm River in February by heavy enemy resistance, the division finally crossed on 28 February near Olzheim, and raced on across the Kyll on 7 March. After a short rest, the 4th moved across the Rhine on 29 March at Worms, attacked and secured Würzburg and by 3 April had established a bridgehead across the Main at Ochsenfurt. Speeding southeast across Bavaria, the division had reached Miesbach on the Isar on 2 May 1945, when it was relieved and placed on occupation duty. Writer J. D. Salinger served with the division from 1942–1945.

Order of battle

 Headquarters, 4th Infantry Division
 8th Infantry Regiment
 12th Infantry Regiment
 22nd Infantry Regiment
 Headquarters and Headquarters Battery, 4th Infantry Division Artillery
 20th Field Artillery Battalion (155 mm)
 29th Field Artillery Battalion (105 mm)
 42nd Field Artillery Battalion (105 mm)
 44th Field Artillery Battalion (105 mm)
 4th Engineer Combat Battalion 
 4th Medical Battalion
 4th Cavalry Reconnaissance Troop (Mechanized)
 Headquarters, Special Troops, 4th Infantry Division
 Headquarters Company, 4th Infantry Division
 704th Ordnance Light Maintenance Company 
 4th Quartermaster Company
 4th Signal Company
 Military Police Platoon
 Band
 4th Counterintelligence Corps Detachment

Casualties

 Total battle casualties: 22,660
 Killed in action: 4,097
 Wounded in action: 17,371
 Missing in action: 461
 Prisoner of war: 731
 Days of combat: 299

Post War/Early Cold War
The division returned to the United States in July 1945 and was stationed at Camp Butner North Carolina, preparing for deployment to the Pacific. After the war ended it was deactivated on 5 March 1946. It was reactivated as a training division at Fort Ord, California on 15 July 1947.

On 1 October 1950, it was redesignated a combat division, training at Fort Benning, Georgia. In May 1951 it deployed to Germany as the first of four United States divisions committed to the North Atlantic Treaty Organization during the early years of the Cold War. The division headquarters was at Frankfurt. After a five-year tour in Germany, the division redeployed to Fort Lewis, Washington in May 1956.

The division was replaced in Germany by the 3rd Armored Division as part of an Operation Gyroscope deployment.  The division was reduced to zero strength, the colors were transferred to Fort Lewis, Washington, and the division was reestablished by reflagging the 71st Infantry Division (which itself had just returned from Alaska) on 15 September 1956.

On 1 April 1957, the division was reorganized as a Pentomic Division.  The division's three infantry regiments (the 8th, 12th and 22nd) were inactivated, with their elements reorganized into five infantry battle groups (the 1-8 IN, 1-12 IN, 1-22 IN, 2-39 IN and the 2-47 IN).

On 1 October 1963, the division was reorganized as a Reorganization Objective Army Division (ROAD).  Three Brigade Headquarters were activated and Infantry units were reorganized into battalions.

The 6th Tank Battalion of the 2d Armored Division, Fort Hood, Texas, was sent to Korea during the war to serve with the 24th Infantry Division. The lineages of the tank companies within the battalion are perpetuated by battalions of today's 66th and 67th Armor Regiments in the 4th Infantry Division.

Vietnam War
The 4th Infantry Division deployed from Fort Lewis to Camp Enari, Pleiku, Vietnam on 25 September 1966 and served more than four years, returning to Fort Carson, Colorado on 8 December 1970. Two brigades operated in the Central Highlands/II Corps Zone, but its 3rd Brigade, including the division's armor battalion, was sent to Tây Ninh Province northwest of Saigon to take part in Operation Attleboro (September to November 1966), and later Operation Junction City (February to May 1967), both in War Zone C. After nearly a year of combat, the 3rd Brigade's battalions officially became part of the 25th Infantry Division in exchange for the battalions of the 25th's 3rd Brigade, then in Quảng Ngãi Province as part of the division-sized Task Force Oregon.

Deployment table 1966–1970 

Throughout its service in Vietnam the division conducted combat operations ranging from the western Central Highlands along the border between Cambodia and Vietnam to Qui Nhơn on the South China Sea. The division experienced intense combat against People's Army of Vietnam regular forces in the mountains surrounding Kontum in the autumn of 1967. The division's 3rd Brigade was withdrawn from Vietnam in April 1970 and deactivated at Fort Lewis.

In May the remainder of the division conducted cross-border operations during the Cambodian Incursion. The division then moved to An Khe. The "Ivy Division" returned from Vietnam on 7 December 1970, and was rejoined in Fort Carson by its former 3rd Brigade from Hawaii, where it had re-deployed as part of the withdrawal of the 25th Infantry Division. One battalion remained in Vietnam as a separate organization until January 1972.

Order of battle
 Division Headquarters and Headquarters Company (HHC)
 Division Support Command
 Support Command HHC and Band
 4th Supply and Transportation Battalion
 4th Administration Company
 704th Maintenance Battalion
 4th Medical Battalion
 4th Infantry Division Band
1st Brigade
1st Battalion, 8th Infantry ("Bullets")
3rd Battalion, 8th Infantry ("Dragoons")
3rd Battalion, 12th Infantry ("Braves")
2nd Brigade
1st Battalion, 12th Infantry ("Red Warriors")
1st Battalion, 22nd Infantry ("Regulars") (Separate from November 1970–January 1972)
2nd Battalion, 8th Infantry ("Panthers") (Mechanized)
3rd Brigade (from 25th Infantry Division)
1st Battalion, 14th Infantry ("Golden Dragons") (from 25th Infantry Division, August 1967–December 1970)
1st Battalion, 35th Infantry ("Cacti Green") (from 25th Infantry Division, August 1967–April 1970)
2nd Battalion, 35th Infantry ("Cacti Blue") (from 25th Infantry Division, August 1967–December 1970)
1st Battalion, 69th Armor ("Black Panthers") (from 25th Infantry Division, August 1967–April 1970)
 3rd Brigade (to 25th Infantry Division)
 2nd Battalion, 12th Infantry ("Lethal Warriors") (to 25th Infantry Division, August 1967–April 1971)
 2nd Battalion, 22nd Infantry (to 25th Infantry Division, August 1967–December 1970)
 3rd Battalion, 22nd Infantry (to 25th Infantry Division, August 1967–December 1970)
 2nd Battalion, 34th Armor ("Dreadnaughts") (to 25th Infantry Division, August 1967 – December 1970)
 Division Artillery
 Headquarters and Headquarters Battery
 6th Battalion, 29th Artillery (105 mm) (1st Brigade)
 4th Battalion, 42nd Artillery (105 mm) (2nd Brigade)
 2nd Battalion, 9th Artillery (105 mm) (August 1967–April 1970) (from 3rd Brigade, 25th Infantry Division)
 2nd Battalion, 77th Artillery (105 mm) (to 25th Infantry Division, August 1967–December 1970)
 5th Battalion, 16th Artillery (155 mm/8 inch) (General support)
 4th Military Police Company
 4th Aviation Battalion
 1st Squadron, 10th Cavalry Regiment ("Buffalo Soldiers")
 4th Engineer Battalion
 124th Signal Battalion

Attached units

 2nd Squadron, 1st Cavalry Regiment ("Blackhawks")
 7th Squadron, 17th Cavalry Regiment ("Ruthless Riders")
 Company E, 20th Infantry (Long Range Patrol)
 Company E, 58th Infantry (Long Range Patrol)
 Company K (Ranger), 75th Infantry (Airborne)
 43rd Chemical Detachment
 374th Army Security Agency Company (In Vietnam as the 374th Radio Research Company)

Casualties

 2,531 killed in action
 15,229 wounded in action

Post Vietnam/Late Cold War and REFORGER

Returning to the US, the Division resumed training and Cold War missions. The Division remained stationed at Fort Carson, Colorado from 1970 through 1995.  During this period, the Division was converted to a mechanized infantry division, and frequently sent constituent units to Europe to participate in the annual REFORGER exercises to continue the Cold War mission of deterring Communist threats.  In 1976 the Division's 4th Brigade was established and permanently stationed forward at Wiesbaden, West Germany as Brigade 76, remaining there until being inactivated in 1984.  It was during their time in Fort Carson that the Division assumed the nickname, "Ironhorse".

Force XXI
In December 1995, the Ivy Division was reflagged at Ft Hood, Tx when the 2nd Armored Division was deactivated as part of the downsizing of the Army. One brigades remained at Ft Carson as 3rd Brigade 4th Infantry Division stationed at Ft Carson. The division became an experimental division of the Army, as it had been in the early 1940s.  Until completing the mission in October 2001, 4ID led the Army into the 21st century under Force XXI, the Army's modernization program.  The division tested and fielded state-of-the-art digital communications equipment, night fighting gear, advanced weaponry, organization, and doctrine to prepare the Army for the future.

From 1989 to 1996 the 116th Cavalry Brigade of the Idaho and Oregon Army National Guard served as roundout brigade of the division.

Iraq War

Alerted on 19 January 2003, the 4th Infantry Division was scheduled to take part in the Iraq War in the spring of 2003 by spearheading an advance from Turkey into northern Iraq. The Turkish Parliament refused to grant permission for the operation and the division's equipment remained offshore on ships during the buildup for the war (see below). Its original mission, holding 13 Iraqi divisions along the "Green Line" in northern Iraq, was executed by joint Task Force Viking.

Order of battle ìn Iraq War:

1st Brigade (Raider)
1st Battalion, 8th Infantry Regiment (Mech) - Detached From 3rd Brigade
1st Battalion, 22nd Infantry Regiment (Mech)
1st Battalion, 66th Armor Regiment
3rd Battalion, 66th Armor Regiment
4th BN, 42nd Field Artillery Regiment (155SP)
2nd Brigade (WarHorse)
2nd Battalion, 8th Infantry Regiment (Mech)
1st Battalion, 67th Armor Regiment
3rd Battalion, 67th Armor Regiment
3rd Battalion, 16th Field Artillery Regiment (155SP)
1st Squadron, 10th Cavalry Regiment
3rd Brigade (Iron)
1st Battalion, 12th Infantry Regiment (Mech)
1st Battalion, 68th Armor Regiment
3rd Battalion, 29th Field Artillery Regiment (155SP)
4th Engineer Battalion
64th Forward Support Battalion
4th Infantry Division Artillery (DIVARTY)
1st Battalion, 44th Air Defense Artillery Regiment

As stated above, the Turkish situation kept the division from participating in the invasion as originally planned, instead joining the fight as a follow-on force.  After quickly organizing materiel and manpower at ports in Kuwait, the division moved to positions around Baghdad in April 2003. After all divisional assets were established in Iraq, the Brigade combat teams attacked selected areas.  The main avenues of attack for the division pushed north through Tikrit and Mosul. Headquartered in Saddam Hussein's former palaces, the 4th ID was deployed in the northern area of the Sunni Triangle. The 4th Infantry Division was spread all over Northern Iraq from Kirkuk to the Iranian border and as far south as Al Wihda, southeast of Baghdad. 

The Division Headquarters was located at FOB Ironhorse in the old Saddam Presidential Complex in Tikrit, while the 1st Brigade Combat Team headquarters was at FOB Raider south of the city. To the south in the volatile Diyala Province was the 2nd Brigade Combat Team headquarters at FOB Warhorse just northeast of Baqubah. The 3rd Brigade Combat Team was at FOB Anaconda at the Balad Air Base northwest of Khalis and DIVARTY, along with elements of the 1st Battalion, 44th Air Defense Artillery Regiment at FOB Gunner, Al Taji airfield. To the far north stationed at an air field just on the outskirts of the city of Kirkuk were elements of the division's 4th Artillery Brigade and attached units, until mid-September when it was moved back to Tikrit. The 4th Infantry Division also disarmed the MEK warriors in Northern Iraq in July–August 2003.

On 13 December 2003, elements of the 1st Brigade Combat Team participated in Operation Red Dawn with United States special operations forces, who captured Saddam Hussein, former President of Iraq.

The division rotated out of Iraq in the spring of 2004, and was relieved by the 1st Infantry Division.

Some have been critical of the division under its then-commander Maj. Gen. Raymond T. Odierno, calling its stance belligerent during their initial entry into Iraq after the ground war had ceased and arguing that the unit's lack of a 'hearts and minds' approach was ineffective in quelling the insurgency. In his unit's defense, Odierno and others have argued that enemy activity in the 4th ID's area of operations was higher than in any other area of the country because of the region's high concentration of Sunni resistance groups still loyal to Saddam Hussein's regime. His unit was headquartered in Hussein's hometown and this environment necessitated a different approach from those of units located in the more peaceful regions in the south and the north of the country.

Significant OIF I operations

 Operation Planet X (15 May 2003)
 Operation Peninsula Strike (9 June 2003 – 12 June 2003)
 Operation Desert Scorpion (15 June 2003 – 29 June 2003)
 Operation Sidewinder (29 June 2003 – 7 July 2003)
 Operation Soda Mountain (12 July 2003 – 17 July 2003)
 Operation Ivy Serpent (12 July 2003 – 21 July 2003)
 Operation Ivy Lightning (12 August 2003)
 Operation Ivy Needle (26 August 2003)
 Operation Industrial Sweep (October 2003)
 Operation Ivy Cyclone (7 November 2003)
 Operation Ivy Cyclone II (17 November 2003)
 Operation Red Dawn (13 December 2003)
 Operation Ivy Blizzard (17 December 2003)
 Operation Arrowhead Blizzard (17 December 2003)
 Operation Rifles Fury (21 December 2003)

Subsequent Iraq Deployments
The division's second deployment to Iraq began in the fall of 2005. The division headquarters replaced the 3rd Infantry Division, which had been directing security operations as the headquarters for Multi-National Division – Baghdad. The 4th ID assumed responsibility on 7 January 2006 for four provinces in central and southern Iraq: Baghdad, Karbala, An-Najaf and Babil. On 7 January 2006, MND-Baghdad also assumed responsibility for training Iraqi security forces and conducting security operations in the four provinces.

During the second deployment, 3rd Brigade of the 4th Infantry Division area of operation (AO) was Saladin and Diala provinces and was assigned to conduct security and training operations under the command of Task Force Band of Brothers, led initially by the 101st Airborne Division (Air Assault) and later 25th Infantry Division Headquartered out of FOB Warhorse. Later during the third deployment the unit was involved in the 2008 Battle of Sadr City.

In March 2008 the 1st Brigade Combat Team deployed to Iraq and was stationed in Baghdad. The 1st Battalion, 66th Armor Regiment was detached from the brigade and attached to the 4th Brigade, 10th Mountain Division which was stationed at FOB Rustamiyah in Al Amin, Baghdad. The brigade returned home to Fort Hood, Texas in March 2009 and immediately began preparing for reassignment to Fort Carson, Colorado.

In these three deployments to Iraq:
84 4ID/Task Force Ironhorse soldiers were killed in 2003–2004
235 4ID/Multi-National Division – Baghdad soldiers lost their lives in 2005–2006
113 4ID/Multi-National Division – Baghdad soldiers were killed in 2007–2009

July 2009 saw another division change of command as MG David Perkins took command to become the 56th Commanding General of the 4th Infantry Division. With this change of command, even more significant events happened as the 4ID completed 14 years calling Fort Hood, TX home and returned to Fort Carson, CO, where they had served from late 1970 through late 1995. It was at this time that the 4th Division headquarters and the 1st Brigade Combat Team transferred to Fort Carson, Colorado. The 2nd, and 4th Brigades had already relocated and 3rd Brigade was already at Fort Carson having never moved to Fort Hood and the 4th Infantry Division's Aviation Brigade stayed at Fort Hood, Texas.

The 3rd Brigade of the 4th Infantry Division deployed to southern Iraq from March 2010 to March 2011 in support of Operations Iraqi Freedom and New Dawn in an “Advise and Assist” role. 3rd Brigade Soldiers served alongside 50,000+ other U.S. service members under the command of United States Forces- Iraq. Soldiers from the brigade assisted in the training and preparation of Iraqi forces tasked with taking over responsibility of the southern sector of Iraq after U.S. forces were expected to withdraw from the area. 3rd Brigade Soldiers were re-flagged from being designated as a “Brigade Combat Team” and instead were reassigned as an “Advise and Assist” Brigade. The Brigade was still tasked with completing combat operations within the southern sector Area Of Operation (A.O.) in Iraq and were exposed to direct combat with anti coalition forces operating within the A.O. The 3rd Brigade returned to Fort Carson in March of 2011 in order to resume garrison duties.

War in Afghanistan
In May 2009 the 4th Brigade Combat Team deployed in support of Operation Enduring Freedom X for a 12-month combat rotation. The 1st Battalion 12th Infantry Regiment deployed to Regional Command South. Task Force 1-12 operated in Maiwand district and Zhari district, namely the Arghandab River Valley, west of Kandahar City. Referred to as "The Heart of Darkness" for its notoriety as the birthplace of the Taliban, the soldiers of Task Force 1-12 operated in a very complex combat environment. 

Much of the fighting was conducted in notoriously dense grape fields, which insurgent forces used as cover and concealment for a variety of complex attacks on coalition forces. The 2nd Battalion 12th Infantry Regiment deployed in to Regional Command East and was based in the Pech River Valley, Kunar Province, home to the Korangal Valley, Waygal, Shuriak, and Wata Pour Valleys. During its rotation, the 2nd Battalion saw heavy combat throughout the area.

The 3rd Squadron 61st Cavalry Regiment was also deployed to Regional Command East and served during its rotation in Kunar and Nuristan Provinces.  Task Force Destroyer saw intense combat, namely the Battle of Kamdesh in which a combat outpost was attacked by over 300 insurgents in a complex attack 20 miles from the Pakistan border. For their bravery, on October 3, 2009, Bravo Troop 3-61 Cavalry became the most decorated unit of the Afghanistan War. The Battle of Kamdesh was the first in 50 years in which the Medal of Honor was given to two living servicemen. 

Some reports indicate that the US soldiers of 4th ID did not maintain their efforts in the fight and withdrew inside of buildings to wait for QRF to arrive from elements of 10th Mountain Division. In May 2010, elements of the 4th Brigade Combat Team began to redeploy to Fort Carson and immediately began assisting and training sister units for future contingency operations, as well as training for its own future combat deployments. 38 soldiers from the brigade died during the deployment. For its actions 4th Brigade Combat Team was awarded the Valorous Unit Award, the second highest unit decoration awarded to United States Army units.

Upon 4BCT redeploying to Fort Carson, the rest of the division was set to deploy to Afghanistan. The 1st and 2nd Brigade Combat Teams also served in Afghanistan building on the efforts that were initiated by 4BCT. The 4th BCT has once again deployed in an advise and assist capacity, fulfilling the mission of training and preparing the Afghan Security Forces for the handover of all combat operations in the upcoming years.

The 1st and 2nd Brigade Combat Teams deployed to Afghanistan in support of Operation Freedom's Sentinel in 2017.

Operation Inherent Resolve
Soldiers assigned to the 4th Infantry Division completed a nine-month deployment to Iraq in 2015, in support of Operation Inherent Resolve. This operation supported the military intervention against the Islamic State of Iraq and the Levant.

In February 2015, troops from the division's 3rd Armored Brigade Combat Team were deployed to Southwest Asia in support of Operation Inherent Resolve in Iraq and Syria.

In September 2021, troops from the division's 1st Stryker Brigade Combat Team deployed to Erbil Air Base in Iraq following base closures for Operation Inherent Resolve.

Operation Freedom's Sentinel
In October 2015, the US Army announced that 1,000 troops from 4th Infantry Division's Combat Aviation Brigade would be sent to Afghanistan sometime in winter, with another 1,800 soldiers from the 4th ID's 2nd Infantry Brigade Combat Team deploying to Afghanistan in the spring 2016. On 12 August 2016, a U.S. Soldier from 1st Battalion, 12th Infantry Regiment, 2nd Brigade Combat Team, 4th ID died from a noncombat-related injury in Kandahar.

Operation Atlantic Resolve
On 3 November 2016, the U.S. Army deployed some 4,000 soldiers from 3rd Armored Brigade Combat Team to Europe in winter in support of Operation Atlantic Resolve - to help deter possible Russian aggression. The brigade will arrive in Poland and will fan out across the continent, one battalion with M1 Abrams tanks will cover the Baltic region of Estonia and Latvia, while another will operate in Germany. A mechanised infantry battalion with M2 Bradley troop carriers and M1 Abrams tanks will have a foothold in the Romanian and Bulgarian region, whilst Brigade headquarters will remain in Poland, along with an armoured cavalry unit and a field artillery battalion wielding self-propelled M109 Paladin howitzers.

List of Commanders
List of commanders of 4th Infantry Division (United States)

Current structure

The 4th Infantry Division consists of a division headquarters battalion, three brigade combat teams (two Stryker and one armored), a division artillery, a combat aviation brigade, and a division sustainment brigade:
  4th Infantry Division (Fort Carson, Colorado)
 Division Headquarters and Headquarters Battalion
 1st Stryker Brigade Combat Team (Raiders)
 Brigade Headquarters and Headquarters Company
  2nd Squadron, 1st Cavalry Regiment (1st Regiment of Dragoons)
  1st Battalion, 38th Infantry Regiment (Rock of the Marne)
  2nd Battalion, 23rd Infantry Regiment (Tomahawks)
  4th Battalion, 9th Infantry Regiment (Manchu)
  2nd Battalion, 12th Field Artillery Regiment (Viking)
  299th Brigade Engineer Battalion
  4th Brigade Support Battalion (Packhorse)
 2nd Stryker Brigade Combat Team (Mountain Warrior)
 Brigade Headquarters and Headquarters Company (Mountain GOAT)
  3rd Squadron, 61st Cavalry Regiment (Destroyers)
  1st Battalion, 12th Infantry Regiment (Red Warriors)
  2nd Battalion, 12th Infantry Regiment (Lethal Warriors)
  1st Battalion, 41st Infantry Regiment (Straight and Stalwart)
  2nd Battalion, 77th Field Artillery Regiment (Steel)
  52nd Brigade Engineer Battalion (Patriots)
  704th Brigade Support Battalion (Blacksmiths)
 3rd Armored Brigade Combat Team (Iron) 
 Brigade Headquarters and Headquarters Company
  4th Squadron, 10th Cavalry Regiment (BlackJack)
  1st Battalion, 66th Armor Regiment (Iron Knights)
  1st Battalion, 68th Armor Regiment (Silver Lions)
  1st Battalion, 8th Infantry Regiment (Fighting Eagles)
  3rd Battalion, 29th Field Artillery Regiment (Pacesetters)
  588th Brigade Engineer Battalion (Lone Star)
  64th Brigade Support Battalion (Mountaineers)
 4th Infantry Division Artillery
 Headquarters and Headquarters Battery
 Combat Aviation Brigade, 4th Infantry Division (Ivy Eagles)
  Brigade Headquarters and Headquarters Company
  6th Squadron (Attack/Reconnaissance), 17th Cavalry Regiment
  2nd Battalion (General Support), 4th Aviation Regiment 
  3rd Battalion (Assault), 4th Aviation Regiment
  4th Battalion (Attack/Reconnaissance), 4th Aviation Regiment
  404th Aviation Support Battalion
  4th Infantry Division Sustainment Brigade (formerly known as 43rd Sustainment Brigade)
 Special Troops Battalion
  68th Combat Sustainment Support Battalion

Honors

Campaign participation credit
World War I:
 Aisne-Marne;
 Saint-Mihiel;
 Meuse-Argonne;
 Champagne 1918;
 Lorraine 1918
World War II:
 Normandy (with arrowhead) (Except 3rd Brigade);
 Northern France (Except 3rd Brigade);
 Rhineland (Except 3rd Brigade);
 Ardennes-Alsace (Except 3rd Brigade);
 Central Europe (Except 3rd Brigade);
Vietnam:
 Counteroffensive, Phase II;
 Counteroffensive, Phase III;
 Tet Counteroffensive;
 Counteroffensive, Phase IV;
 Counteroffensive, Phase V;
 Counteroffensive, Phase VI;
 Tet 69/Counteroffensive;
 Summer-Fall 1969;
 Winter-Spring 1970;
 Sanctuary Counteroffensive (Except 3rd Brigade);
 Counteroffensive, Phase VII (Except 3rd Brigade).
Operation Iraqi Freedom:
 Liberation of Iraq – 19 March 2003 to 1 May 2003.
 Transition of Iraq – 2 May 2003 to 28 June 2004.
 Iraqi Governance – 29 June 2004 to 15 December 2005.
 National Resolution – 16 December 2005 to 9 January 2007.
 Iraqi Surge	- 10 January 2007 to 18 December 2008.
 Iraqi Sovereignty – 1 January 2009 to 31 August 2010.
 Operation New Dawn – 1 September 2010 to 31 December 2011.
Operation Enduring Freedom (Afghanistan):
 Consolidation II – 1 October 2006 to 30 November 2009.
 Consolidation III – 1 December 2009 to 30 June 2011.
 Transition I – 1 July 2011 to 31 December 2014.
Operation Inherent Resolve – 15 June 2014 - TBD.

Decorations
 Presidential Unit Citation (Army) for PLEIKU PROVINCE (1st Brigade Only)
 Presidential Unit Citation (Army) for DAK TO DISTRICT (1st Brigade Only)
 Presidential Unit Citation (Army) for SUOI TRE (3rd Brigade Only)
 Belgian Fourragere 1940
 Cited in the Order of the Day of the Belgian Army for action in BELGIUM
 Cited in the Order of the Day of the Belgian Army for action in the ARDENNES
 Republic of Vietnam Cross of Gallantry with Palm for VIETNAM 1966–1969
 Republic of Vietnam Cross of Gallantry with Palm for VIETNAM 1969–1970
 Republic of Vietnam Civil Action Honor Medal, First Class for VIETNAM 1966–1969
 Army Superior Unit Award (Selected Units) for Force XXI Test and Evaluation (1995–1996)
 Valorous Unit Award (1st Brigade Combat Team & Supporting units) for Operation Red Dawn, Iraq – 2003

Medal of Honor recipients

World War I
William Shemin (posthumously)

World War II
Marcario Garcia
George L. Mabry, Jr.
Bernard J. Ray (posthumously)
Theodore Roosevelt Jr. (posthumously)
Pedro Cano (posthumously)

Vietnam War
Leslie Allen Bellrichard (posthumously)
Thomas W. Bennett (posthumously)
Donald W. Evans, Jr. (posthumously)
Bruce Alan Grandstaff (posthumously)
Dwight H. Johnson
Phill G. McDonald (posthumously)
David H. McNerney
Franky Zoly Molnar (posthumously)
Anund C. Roark (posthumously)
Elmelindo R. Smith (posthumously)
Louis E. Willett (posthumously)

Afghanistan War
Clinton L. Romesha
Ty Carter
Florent A. Groberg

In popular culture
 4th Infantry Division's shoulder patch—the Ivy Patch, is worn as a combat patch by two characters in the 1986 Vietnam War movie Platoon, by Sgt. Warren, portrayed by Tony Todd, and by Capt. Harris, portrayed by Dale Dye.
 4th Infantry Division has been mentioned in The Last of Us: Left Behind.
 4th Infantry Division was featured in the film, The Longest Day.
 4th Infantry Division soldiers appear in the film Is Paris Burning.

References

 Bibliography
 King, M., M. Collins, and J. Nulton. To War with the 4th: A Century of Frontline Combat with the U.S. 4th Infantry Division, from the Argonne to the Ardennes to Afghanistan Philadelphia: Casemate, 2016. . (Issued in anticipation of the centennial anniversary of the formation of the 4th Infantry Division on 17 November 2017)
 Fourth Infantry (Ivy) Division Association. 4th Infantry "Ivy" Division. Paducah, KY: Turner Pub, 1987. 
 Knapp, George W., and Gayle E. Knapp. A Chaplain's Duty: Faith and Courage on the Front Line : Letters from WWII : Chaplain George W. Knapp 4th Infantry Division. Marietta, GA: Deeds Publishing, 2010. 
 United States. 4th Infantry Division: Occupation of Germany, 1952. Atlanta: A. Love, 1952. 
 United States. Famous Fourth: The Story of the 4th Infantry Division. Stars and Stripes, 1945.

Further reading
  – a journal from a member of the 4th Infantry Division 2003–2004
 Wilson, George, If you survive, New York, Ballantine books 1987 
 Eggleston, Rhonda, "Ladies of the Ironhorse: The Voices of Those Who Wait at Home", St. John's Press 2005

External links

 4th Infantry Division Home Page – official site.
 4th Infantry Division for Vietnam Veterans – unofficial site.
 4th Infantry Division Association
 4th History @ GlobalSercurity.org website
 Famous Fourth: The Story of the 4th Infantry Division (WWII unit history booklet)
 Camp Greene Website
 4th ID Order of Battle
 4th US Infantry Division World War II in Normandy Combat Film DVD June 1944
 4th Infantry Division in World War II Europe Combat Film DVD, August–November 1944
 

004th Infantry Division, U.S.
Infantry Division, U.S. 004th
04
004th Infantry Division
Infantry divisions of the United States Army in World War II
Military units and formations established in 1917